Refugio County is a county located in the U.S. state of Texas. As of the 2020 census, its population was 6,741. Its county seat is Refugio. The county originated as a municipality of Mexico in 1834 and was classified as a county in 1837.

Geography

Major highways
  U.S. Highway 77
  Interstate 69E is currently under construction and will follow the current route of U.S. 77 in most places.
   U.S. Highway 77 Alternate/U.S. Highway 183
  State Highway 35
  State Highway 239
  Farm to Market Road 136
  Farm to Market Road 774
  Farm to Market Road 2441
  Farm to Market Road 2678

Adjacent counties
 Victoria County (north)
 Calhoun County (northeast)
 Aransas County (southeast)
 San Patricio County (south)
 Bee County (west)
 Goliad County (northwest)

National protected area
 Aransas National Wildlife Refuge (part)

Demographics

As of the 2020 United States census, there were 6,741 people, 2,566 households, and 1,730 families residing in the county.

As of the census of 2000,  7,828 people, 2,985 households, and 2,176 families resided in the county.  The population density was 10 people/sq mi (4/km2).  The 3,669 housing units  averaged 5 per sq mi (2/km2).  The racial makeup of the county was 80.22% White, 6.77% African American, 0.56% Native American, 0.29% Asian,  10.47% from other races, and 1.67% from two or more races.  Hispanics or Latinos of any race were about 48.6% of the population.

Of the 2,985 households, 31.60% had children under 18 living with them, 55.10% were married couples living together, 12.80% had a female householder with no husband present, and 27.10% were not families. About 24.60% of all households were made up of individuals, and 11.50% had someone living alone who was 65 or older.  The average household size was 2.59, and the average family size was 3.07.

In the county, the population was distributed as 26.10% under 18, 7.40% from 18 to 24, 25.90% from 25 to 44, 24.00% from 45 to 64, and 16.60% who were 65 or older.  The median age was 39 years. For every 100 females, there were 95.80 males.  For every 100 females 18 and over, there were 92.40 males.

The median income for a household in the county was $29,986, and for a family was $36,162. Males had a median income of $29,667 versus $16,565 for females. The per capita income for the county was $15,481.  About 14.30% of families and 17.80% of the population were below the poverty line, including 24.20% of those under age 18 and 16.30% of those age 65 or over.

Geology
The Tom O'Connor oil field was discovered in 1934 with the Quintana No. 1-A well, the location of which was based on a gravity survey and a trend of other fields in the southwest and northeast between the Vicksburg Fault Zone and the Frio Fault Zone.  The field is a structural trap formed by an anticline on the downthrown side of the Vicksburg Fault Zone.  The faulting is due to "large-scale gravity slumping", and these types of faults are referred to as growth faults, which are normal faults that occur simultaneously with sedimentation.  Most of the oil and half the gas is produced at depths between 4500 and 6000 feet, from 15 oil reservoirs and 4 gas reservoirs in the Oligocene Frio Formation sandstones deposited during Marine regression, notably the "5900 foot sand", the "5800 foot sand", the "5500 foot sand" and the "5200 foot sand".  Gas with some oil is found above these sandstones in the Oligocene Anahuac Formation, deposited in a Marine transgression, notably the "4400 foot Greta sand".  Dry gas is found in the Miocene-Pliocene Fleming sandstones deposited during marine regression, notably the "L-4 sand, which is overlain by 1400 feet of Pleistocene Lissie sandstones.

Healthcare
Medical care is provided to the citizens of Refugio County through a county hospital, several rural health clinics, a wellness clinic, and a specialty clinic. Refugio County Medical Center opened in 1940 due to a surge in the population, and underwent expansions in 1962 and 2009. The hospital was run by religious orders until the 1970s, when Refugio County assumed operations. A hospital district was established in 1977.

Communities

Cities
 Austwell

Towns
 Bayside
 Refugio (County seat)
 Woodsboro

Census-designated place
 Tivoli

Ghost towns
 Copano
 St. Mary's of Aransas

Politics

See also

 Structural evolution of the Louisiana gulf coast
 List of museums in the Texas Gulf Coast
 National Register of Historic Places listings in Refugio County, Texas
 Recorded Texas Historic Landmarks in Refugio County

References

External links
 
 Refugio County government
 "Refugio County Profile" from the Texas Association of Counties 
 Exxon wins, again, in oil field sabotage case
 At Tom O'Connor Ranch, Field Production High

 
1837 establishments in the Republic of Texas
Populated places established in 1837
Hurricane Ike